The following is a list of awards and nominations received by American filmmaker Spike Lee. 

Over the course of his distinguished film career, Lee has received various awards and nominations. He has received five competitive Academy Award nominations winning Best Adapted Screenplay for BlacKkKlansman (2018). He has also received two special Oscars, a Student Academy Award for Joe's Bed-Stuy Barbershop: We Cut Heads (1983), and an Honorary Academy Award for Lifetime Achievement in 2016. He has also received two Primetime Emmy Awards for HBO documentary series When the Levees Broke (2007). He has also received five Golden Globe Award nominations, a Grammy Award nomination, and four British Academy Film Award nominations.

Major Associations

Academy Awards

British Academy Film Awards

César Awards

Golden Globe Awards

Grammy Awards

Primetime Emmy Awards

Peabody Awards

Film Festival Awards

American Black Film Festival

Atlanta Film Festival

Berlin International Film Festival

Cannes Film Festival

Other awards

Black Movie Awards

Black Reel Awards

Detroit Film Critics Society Awards

The Dorothy and Lillian Gish Prize

Location Managers Guild Awards 
Spike Lee has been recognized by the Location Managers Guild International with their Trailblazer Award for his innovative and collaborative use of locations as a distinct character in his films. 

Lee saluted location managers, saying without them, "I would not be able do what I do" as he rarely shoots on sets. "I'm out in the streets; I love shooting in the streets of New York City, especially the people's republic of Brooklyn, New York." 

His films Da 5 Bloods & BlacKkKlansman have previously been nominated for their use of locations in their annual awards ceremony.

References

Lee, Spike, list of awards and nominations received by
Lee, Spike, list of awards and nominations received by
Awards